Arlington (also Rockdale) is a census-designated place (CDP) in southeastern Carbon County, Wyoming, United States. The population was 25 at the 2010 census.

Geography
Arlington lies at the intersection of Interstate 80 and WYO 13, northwest of Laramie and east of the city of Rawlins, the county seat of Carbon County.

History
In its earliest years, Arlington was a commercial stop along the Overland Trail.  Founded circa 1860, it began with the establishment of a bridge and stage stop at the crossing of Rock Creek, after which it was named until the early twentieth century.  In 1983, the community was listed on the National Register of Historic Places as a historic district for its nineteenth-century significance.

In 1882, a post office was established at Rock Creek under the name of "Rock Dale."  Except for a gap in 1924 and 1925, a post office with the name of Arlington was operated in the community from 1902 to 1943.

References

Populated places established in the 1860s
Census-designated places in Carbon County, Wyoming
Stagecoach stations on the National Register of Historic Places in Wyoming
Census-designated places in Wyoming
Historic districts on the National Register of Historic Places in Wyoming
National Register of Historic Places in Carbon County, Wyoming